"King Tim III (Personality Jock)" is a 1979 song by the Fatback Band from the disco album XII. Released on March 25, 1979, a few months before "Rapper's Delight" (which is widely regarded as the first commercially released hip hop song), this song is often cited as the beginning of recorded hip hop. The title refers to vocalist Tim Washington.

The song was originally the B-side of the 7-inch single, with the A-side "You're My Candy Sweet" a mid-tempo disco song. However the song stalled at #67 after 4-weeks on the R&B chart and was replaced the following week with "King Tim III (Personality Jock)" on the chart. It peaked at #26 on the R&B chart and stayed on for 11 weeks.

Origins
The origin of "King Tim III" starts when Bill was in his studio with his co-producer Jerry Thomas or as Bill called him "his right hand man". Bill said to him "Jerry, look at this album we doing , it's the Bad Back Seven album." Jerry asks him what he want him to do and Curtis says "I don't know... let's do a rap man!" Jerry said the following sentence, "Do a rap? Hell, we can't even talk!"  Curtis recalls,  "One of the roaders is in the studio with us... Avery, and he said "Hey man, I got a buddy who lives up there in the projects, he's a great rapper.", and I said "Can he rap?" and he said, "Yeah man!" and I said "Bring him in, tomorrow night." and he brought in Timothy Washington and I had to track him down 8 hours in Venice and everything. I flew him in on the trip and I said "Hey man, go in there and start rapping." , and he just started rapping... and that's how it all came about."

References

External links
Fatback Band official site
Bill Curtis Music

1979 songs
1979 singles
Fatback Band songs
American hip hop songs